Zoom and Bored is a 1957 Warner Bros. Merrie Melodies series directed by Chuck Jones. The short was released on September 14, 1957, and stars Wile E. Coyote and the Road Runner.

Plot
The Coyote and Road Runner begin to chase, freezing momentarily for the credits and Latin names to be shown: COYOTE: Famishus vulgaris and ROAD RUNNER: Birdibus zippibus. From here, Road Runner speeds off, leaving the coyote to fall on the ground. Wile E. recovers quickly, kicks up some dust, and begins to chase Road. However, Road Runner leaves so much dust in the road that his pursuer cannot see where he is going. Eventually, except for his ears, Wile E. is completely enclosed in the dust. Road Runner pulls next to Wiley and beeps, alerting the coyote to his surroundings. Wile E.'s expression becomes foreboding, as both are apparently suspended in midair. As the dust clears, the coyote pokes his hands and feet through the bottom of the cloud, and then looks down to see nothing but air below him. The dust completely clears, showing that Road is perched on the edge of a cliff and the coyote on the wrong side of him. The poor coyote, once again, is subject to gravity. Determined not to let this happen again, Wile E. climbs up a very high escarpment and surveys his surroundings for Road Runner...who happens to have pulled up right behind him and now beeps such that the coyote falls back down. Dusting himself off, the coyote gets up and walks out onto the road until Road beeps a second time and sends his rival directly into a low-slung rock plateau.

1. As he hasn't studied it enough, Wiley follows the instructions of The Art of Roadrunner-Trapping: 1. Dig hole in road; 2. Camouflage hole; 3. Wait patiently; and 4. Eat Roadrunner. However, he never gets past the first step, as the jackhammer he uses vibrates enough to pull the coyote into the hole. When the power cord stretches enough to pull the plug out, the coyote climbs out and finds himself vibrating sporadically. To "punish" the book, Wile E. walks over to it and prepares to tear it in half, but one of the vibrations does the job for him.

2. Still trying to stop Road in his tracks, Wile E. builds a brick wall on the mountain roads and waits, with one last leftover vibration from the jackhammer incident. Soon, he hears Road braking in front of the wall. When his ears recover from the sonic assault and the dust cloud settles, he quizzically looks around the corner of the wall to see his own rear end. Wile E. makes random movements, which are imitated by his rear. After looking behind and ahead of him, Wile E. finally determines that this is a duplicate of himself and rolls dynamite under his "doppelganger"'s rear. The firework promptly explodes, and Wile laughs until he realizes it is his own tail on fire. He leaps directly into the air in pain and falls down to the ground.

3. Wile E., knowing about the "birds and the bees," leaves out bird seed for Road Runner while he prepares to release a jar of bumblebees from a distance. But when Wile pulls the lid off, instead of attacking the munching Road Runner next to them, the swarm flies 400 feet in the distance towards the coyote and repeatedly stings him.

4. Wile E. now prepares a second bird-seed trap, this time hoping to squash the flightless bird with an anvil. Of course, when Wile walks onto the board to drop the anvil, it breaks under his weight and falls towards Road Runner, who simply steps to the side out of danger. The board halves fall on top of the resulting large hole to create a convenient bridge for Road Runner back to his lunch.

5. Having had enough of the simple traps, Wile E. builds a long ramp and lights a bomb which should blow up Road Runner when it gets to the bottom. But as soon as he lights the fuse, the bomb goes off.

6. Now, the coyote prepares a giant catapult in the road; however, the boulder is too heavy for the catapult to sling at the passing the bird and flattens its owner.

7. Finally, Wile E. hopes to fire at Road Runner with a harpoon. The rope, however, is around one of the coyote's feet, and drags the coyote's rear over a cactus and under several rocks, then directly into open space. The coyote sees the pickle he is in and recovers in time to grab the very end of the rope. Unfortunately, the rope continues into a very thin pipe, then out onto the road and directly into a chicken race with a truck. Wile E. smashes directly through the truck, even, and then the spear finally impales a rock face, but this leads to the coyote being swung down into the path of a train and bumped all the way up to the edge of a precipice, ragged and exhausted while gasping for air and whimpering. Road Runner pulls up directly behind him, but instead of beeping, the bird shows a soft side by holding up a sign saying: "I just don't have the heart." He dashes back the way he came, and the sign spins to "'Bye!"

Music
The music is Dance of the Comedians from The Bartered Bride by Bedrich Smetana.

See also
 Looney Tunes and Merrie Melodies filmography (1950–1959)

References

External links 
 

1957 animated films
1957 short films
1950s Warner Bros. animated short films
Merrie Melodies short films
Wile E. Coyote and the Road Runner films
Short films directed by Chuck Jones
Films scored by Carl Stalling
Films scored by Milt Franklyn
Animated films about mammals
Animated films about birds
Animated films without speech
Films with screenplays by Michael Maltese
Films about Canis
American comedy short films
American animated short films